John Pfeiffer (born May 9, 1986) is an American politician who has served in the Oklahoma House of Representatives from the 38th district since 2014. He is Cherokee.

References

1986 births
21st-century Native American politicians
Living people
Cherokee Nation state legislators in Oklahoma
Republican Party members of the Oklahoma House of Representatives
21st-century American politicians